Achan is a title of nobility and royalty in Kerala, India. The title was mainly used by Nair feudal lords and was awarded by the Kings of Malabar and Cochin. Famous Achans included the Mangat Achan of Calicut who was the by tradition the Prime Minister of the Zamorin and Paliath Achan, the Prime Minister and Rajah under the Maharajah of Cochin. The ruling house of Palghat(Shekhari Varmas) also bore the title Achan.

References

Nair